Lukfapa Creek is a stream in the U.S. state of Mississippi. It is a tributary to the Pearl River.

Lukfapa is a name derived from the Choctaw language. Variant names are "Coglans Mill Creek", "Lukfahata Creek" and "Lukfodder Creek".

References

Rivers of Mississippi
Rivers of Neshoba County, Mississippi
Tributaries of the Pearl River (Mississippi–Louisiana)
Mississippi placenames of Native American origin